James V. Hollman (April 11, 1835February 2, 1916) was an American merchant and politician.

Hollman was born in Elk Grove, Lafayette County, Michigan Territory. He went to the public schools and was involved in the mercantile business in Platteville, Wisconsin. He served in the Wisconsin Assembly in 1885 and 1886 and was a Republican. Hollman died at his home in Platteville, Wisconsin.

Notes

1835 births
1916 deaths
People from Lafayette County, Wisconsin
People from Platteville, Wisconsin
Businesspeople from Wisconsin
19th-century American businesspeople
Republican Party members of the Wisconsin State Assembly